The Return of Sherlock Holmes is a play written by J. E. Harold Terry and Arthur Rose and originally starring Eille Norwood as Sherlock Holmes. The play premiered at Princes Theatre on October 9, 1923.

Based on the work of Sir Arthur Conan Doyle, the play incorporated aspects of four stories: "The Adventure of the Empty House", "The Adventure of Charles Augustus Milverton", "The Disappearance of Lady Frances Carfax", and "The Red-Headed League". Actor Eille Norwood had previously portrayed Holmes in the Stoll film series from 1921 to 1923.

Cast
Eille Norwood as Sherlock Holmes
H. G. Stoker as Dr. Watson
Molly Kerr as Lady Frances Carfax
Arthur Cullin as Reverend Doctor Shlessinger
Noel Dainton as Hon. Philip Green
Paul Gill as Inspector Lestrade
Lauderdale Maitland as Colonel Sebastian Moran
Eric Stanley as Charles Augustus Milverton
Ann Desmond as Jenny Saunders
Esmé Hubbard as Mrs. Hudson

References

1923 plays
Works based on Sherlock Holmes
British plays
West End plays